Herbert Wursthorn (born 22 June 1957 in Würtingen) is a retired West German middle-distance runner who specialized in the 800 metres.

He won the bronze medal at the 1980 European Indoor Championships in Athletics and the gold medal at the 1981 European Indoor Championships in Athletics. His personal best time was 1:46.75 minutes, achieved in 1980 in Warsaw.

Today Wursthorn works as a psychologist.

1957 births
Living people
West German male middle-distance runners
20th-century German people